Red Rocks Community College (RRCC) is a public community college in Lakewood and Arvada, Colorado.  It is part of the Colorado Community College System.

History 

RRCC was established in 1969 as a campus of the Community College of Denver and opened at a temporary site until the Colorado legislature appropriated funds for construction of a permanent campus at the school's present Lakewood campus. Construction began in 1971 and the first phase of construction was completed in 1973, with a link between the east and west wings of the current building completed in fall 1975. On July 1, 1983 the Red Rocks campus officially became Red Rocks Community College and it opened its second campus in Arvada in 1990. Now the fifth largest community college in Colorado, Red Rocks boasts a diverse student population: traditional students, ESL and international students, veterans, students with disabilities, former offenders, and at-risk learners.

Dr. Michele Haney is the current president of RRCC and assumed duties in January 2008. She is the ninth president of RRCC and holds a Ph.D. in counseling from the University of Wyoming.

Academics 

RRCC offers 650 courses in 150 subject areas. It awards four associate degrees: Associate of Arts, Associate of Science, Associate of General Studies and Associate of Applied Science. 

Certificate programs are offered in dozens of areas, including law enforcement and fire science, business and accounting, computer information systems, construction technology, theater, education, woodworking, health careers, park ranger technology and outdoor education, auto technology and plumbing, and multimedia graphics design.

RRCC offers tutoring and encourages study groups to help students excel in their classes.  A language lab provides assistance for English as a Second Language and for students studying a foreign language. Students with disabilities can find assistance at the Office of Special Services to ensure they have a full learning experience.

RRCC offers flexible course schedules including self-paced classes.

Students looking for more rigor may sign up for honors classes and apply to join the Red Rocks chapter of Phi Theta Kappa, the honor society of two-year colleges.

Campus 

The main Lakewood campus (13300 W. 6th Ave, Lakewood, CO) is on  along Sixth Avenue between Indiana Street and Union Boulevard. Floor-to-ceiling windows provide sweeping views of the Front Range of the Rocky Mountains. The quarter-mile-long building houses a child care center for the children of students, staff and community members, a recreation center, a cafeteria and coffee shop, a bookstore and theater. 

The Arvada campus is on a hilltop northwest of the intersection of I-70 and Kipling. Currently under expansion, this campus provides general education credit along with more specialized studies in the health care industry.

Campus life 
Red Rocks is one of Colorado's 13 community colleges. It is home to 14,000 students a year ranging from high school students taking early college courses, recent high school graduates beginning a bachelor's degree, established persons adding to professional knowledge or starting a brand new career, and retirees exploring courses for personal enjoyment.

Support services include free tutoring, advising, a child care center, services for students with disabilities, a fitness center, Learning and Resource Centers, English as a Second Language courses, student groups and student employment.

An active Student Center provides services and benefits such as discounted sports and movie tickets, campus events and entertainment, student clubs from anime to World of Warcraft, The school mascot is R2C2, a red fox. FAX, copy services, a computer lab with internet access and free printing are available to all students.

Red Rocks Community College Foundation 
Red Rocks Community College Foundation (The RRCC Foundation) is a 501(c)(3) non-profit organization established in 1991. Their mission is to support Red Rocks Community College in its commitment to students, learning, and excellence. They have a Foundation Scholarship Program and are engaged in other program areas including Faculty Teaching Chairs, the Mini-Grants and Dr. Agneta Albinsson Grants, and the Employee Book Fund.

The RRCC Foundation Teaching Chair Program recognizes and awards outstanding faculty. Recipients are selected from full-time faculty following a portfolio review and initial screening by a panel of faculty representatives. The final selection is made by the RRCC Foundation Board of Directors. The program has awarded 21 Endowed Teaching Chairs in support of teaching excellence.

Notable alumni
Heather Armbrust, IFBB professional bodybuilder
Ruben A. Valdez, Former Speaker of the Colorado House of Representatives

References

External links 
Official website

Colorado Community College System
Arvada, Colorado
Education in Lakewood, Colorado
Schools in Jefferson County, Colorado
Educational institutions established in 1969
1969 establishments in Colorado